Real Things is the fifth studio album by American country music artist Joe Nichols, released on August 21, 2007 by Universal South Records. It produced two singles on the US Billboard Hot Country Songs charts with "Another Side of You", which peaked at number 17, and "It Ain't No Crime", which reached number 16.

This album also contains four songs that were previously recorded by other artists. "She's All Lady" was previously recorded by Jamey Johnson on his 2006 debut The Dollar, and "Ain't Nobody Gonna Take That from Me" was previously recorded by Collin Raye on his 2001 album Can't Back Down. "Let's Get Drunk and Fight" was recorded by Aaron Lines on his 2007 album Moments That Matter, from which it was released as a single. Finally, "If I Could Only Fly" is a cover of a Blaze Foley song. "Who Are You When I'm Not Looking" was recorded by Blake Shelton on his album All About Tonight and was released as the second single from that album.

Brent Rowan produced the entire album, working with Mark Wright on all tracks except "Ain't Nobody Gonna Take That from Me" and "If I Could Only Fly".

Track listing

Personnel
Amalgamated from liner notes
Perry Coleman - background vocals on "Comin' Back in a Cadillac" and "It Ain't No Crime"
J. T. Corenflos - electric guitar
Eric Darken - percussion
Shannon Forrest - drums
Paul Franklin - steel guitar, Dobro
Morgane Hayes - background vocals on track 6 and additional background vocals on tracks 5, 8, 11 & 13
Aubrey Haynie - fiddle, mandolin
Wes Hightower - background vocals
Jim Hoke - horns on "Comin' Back in a Cadillac"
John Hughey - steel guitar on track 13
David Hungate - bass guitar, upright bass
Mac McAnally - acoustic guitar, reso-electric guitar
Gordon Mote - piano, Wurlitzer, Fender Rhodes, B3 organ
Joe Nichols - lead vocals, background vocals on tracks 11 & 12
Brent Rowan - acoustic guitar, electric guitar, Tic tac bass, Wurlitzer, horn arrangement, slide guitar, mellotron, sitar, 6 string bass, 12 string acoustic guitar, piano, harmonium
Bryan Sutton - acoustic guitar, mandolin, mandocello
Lee Ann Womack - duet vocals on track 13
Craig Young - bass guitar on track 9 & 13

Universal Records South Family Singers sing on "Let's Get Drunk and Fight"

Chart performance

Album

Singles

References

2007 albums
Joe Nichols albums
Show Dog-Universal Music albums
Albums produced by Brent Rowan
Albums produced by Mark Wright (record producer)